New Jersey's 6th Legislative District is one of 40 in the New Jersey Legislature, covering the Burlington County municipality of Maple Shade Township and the Camden County municipalities of Berlin Township, Cherry Hill Township, Collingswood Borough, Gibbsboro Borough, Haddon Township, Haddonfield Borough, Hi-Nella Borough, Merchantville Borough, Oaklyn Borough, Pennsauken Township, Somerdale Borough, Stratford Borough, Tavistock Borough and Voorhees Township as of the 2011 apportionment.

Demographic characteristics
As of the 2020 United States census, the district had a population of 234,108, of whom 184,707 (78.9%) were of voting age. The racial makeup of the district was 150,824 (64.4%) White, 25,121 (10.7%) African American, 896 (0.4%) Native American, 24,176 (10.3%) Asian, 103 (0.0%) Pacific Islander, 14,822 (6.3%) from some other race, and 18,166 (7.8%) from two or more races. Hispanic or Latino of any race were 31,071 (13.3%) of the population.

The district had 186,310 registered voters as of December 1, 2021, of whom 63,956 (34.3%) were registered as unaffiliated, 87,315 (46.9%) were registered as Democrats, 32,986 (17.7%) were registered as Republicans, and 2,053 (1.1%) were registered to other parties.

Political representation
For the 2022–2023 session, the district is represented in the State Senate by James Beach (D, Voorhees Township) and in the General Assembly by Louis Greenwald (D, Voorhees Township) and Pamela Rosen Lampitt (D, Cherry Hill).

The legislative district is entirely located within New Jersey's 1st congressional district.

1965–1973
The 1964 Supreme Court decision in Reynolds v. Sims required legislative districts' populations be equal as possible. As an interim measure, the 6th District in the 1965 State Senate election encompassed all of Mercer County and elected one person to the Senate. In this case, incumbent Democratic Mercer County Senator Sido L. Ridolfi was elected for a two-year term beginning in 1966.

For the three terms between 1967 and 1973, the Sixth Senate District was split into two Assembly districts. For the 1967 election, since the Sixth only encompassed one county, two senators were elected at-large; in this case, Democrats Ridolfi and Richard J. Coffee were elected for this four-year term. In the 1971 election, with the addition of Hunterdon County into the Sixth, Senate candidates were nominated by Assembly district (see below) and one senator was elected from each district. Republican William E. Schluter was elected from District 6A and Democrat Joseph P. Merlino was elected from District 6B in the 1971 election.

Two Assembly members were elected from each district in 1967, 1969, and 1971. Assembly District 6B was made up of Trenton and Ewing Township while District 6A was composed of the remainder of Mercer County for the 1967 and 1969 elections. In the 1971 election, District 6B was composed of Trenton, Hamilton Township, and Washington Township with District 6A encompassing the remainder of Mercer and the entirety of Hunterdon County.

The members elected to the Assembly from each district are as follows:

District composition since 1973
Upon the creation of 40 equal-population districts in 1973, the 6th District became based around the eastern suburbs of Camden inclusive of Cherry Hill in all iterations. The 1970s district stretched from Berlin borough north to Pennsauken and included Burlington County's Evesham Township and Palmyra. The 1981 redistricting made the 6th solely Camden County-based by heading from Pine Hill east then north to Merchantville, and the cluster of boroughs around Collingswood, Haddonfield, and Haddon Heights. The 1991 redistricting kept the 6th relatively unchanged. The 2001 redistricting removed some of the small boroughs in the Haddon Heights and Barrington vicinity but brought the district to the southern edge of Camden County to include Winslow Township, Chesilhurst, and Waterford Township. Following the 2011 redistricting, the southern Camden County municipalities were eliminated from the 6th and restored some of the immediate Camden suburbs including Collingswood and Pennsauken and expanded the district into Burlington County for the first time since 1982 by including Maple Shade.

Election history

Election results, 1973–present

Senate

General Assembly

Election results, 1965–1973

Senate

District 6 At-large

District 6A

District 6B

General Assembly

District 6A

District 6B

References

Burlington County, New Jersey
Camden County, New Jersey
06